Haplochrois bipunctella is a moth of the family Elachistidae. It is found in North America, including Arizona, Mississippi, New Mexico, Oklahoma and Texas.

Adults are on wing from May to September.

The larvae feed on Croton engelmannii. They create leaf petiole galls and mine the seeds of their host plant.

References

Moths described in 1880
Elachistidae
Moths of North America